Thursday's Child is a 1983 American made-for-television drama film starring Rob Lowe, Gena Rowlands and Don Murray, directed by David Lowell Rich and based on the book by Victoria Poole.

Plot 
Sam Alden is the 17-year-old high school star player in football who seems to have it all. However, his family notices that he is often bothered with fits of coughing. Worried, his parents decide to take him to the hospital, where they are shocked to find out that he has a life-threatening heart disease. Sam has trouble dealing with his illness, but he pretends to still be a joyful teenager to not have his parents worrying even more than they already do. His health is deteriorating, though, and it is eventually revealed that he needs a heart transplant if he wants to survive. This is the beginning of a long journey, which is mentally and physically exhausting. Sam has countless operations, and tests. The search for a donor seems endless to him. Even before the final operation, Sam is forced to deal with several setbacks in his life.

Cast
 Rob Lowe as Sam Alden
 Gena Rowlands as Victoria Alden
 Don Murray as Parker Alden
 Jessica Walter as Roz Richardson
 Tracey Gold as Alix
 Glenn Morrissey as Pokie
 Ken Stovitz as Charlie
 Heidi Bohay as Ruthie
 Elizabeth Keifer as Tina
 Larry Poindexter as Malcolm
 Robin Gammell as Dr. Schroeder
 Alan Fudge as Dr. Baumbartner
 Thomas Hill as Dr. Owens
 Stephen Keep as Dr. Reston
 Curt Lowens as Dr. Wakely

Release
For Rob Lowe, this film meant his official introduction to the screen. The film was shot in 1982 and slated to premier in December 1982. However, it was postponed two times (because of the death of Sam Poole, the real "Sam Alden", around Christmas, 1982) and it eventually premiered in February 1983.

The film was generally well received and was nominated for two Golden Globe Awards. Lowe was nominated in the category Best Performance by an Actor in a Supporting Role in a Series, Mini-Series or Motion Picture Made for TV and Gena Rowlands in the category Best Performance by an Actress in a Mini-Series or Motion Picture Made for TV.

References

External links
 

1983 television films
1983 films
1980s teen drama films
American teen drama films
CBS network films
Films about diseases
American films based on actual events
Films based on American novels
Films directed by David Lowell Rich
Films scored by Lee Holdridge
Hallmark Hall of Fame episodes
1983 drama films
1980s American films